The Mongolian State Honor Guard is an honor guard unit of the Armed Forces of Mongolia. The Mongolian State Honor Guard was founded on 16 August 1955, as an honor guard unit of the People's Army of the Mongolian People's Republic.

Overview 
The honor guard company's different units participate in all major events organized by the Ministry of Defense, such as state arrival ceremonies for foreign heads of state (dignitaries such as Vladimir Putin, Xi Jinping and Shinzo Abe), government and military delegations during their official visits to Ulaanbaatar, as well as a large number of other diverse events. Domestically, another major event is the annual Mongolian State Flag Day parade on Sükhbaatar Square. It also had taken part in the anniversaries of the Battles of Khalkhin Gol and the Khaan Quest military exercise. In 2015, the guard of honor took part in over 200 ceremonial events, including the Moscow Victory Day Parade on Red Square.

It is the only unit authorized to carry a ceremonial white tug as its unit colour on parade.

Uniform
While Mongolia was under a socialist government, the unit's uniform did not differ much from the full dress uniform of the Soviet Army. After 1991, the uniforms from the era of Genghis Khan and the Mongol Empire came back into style within the armed forces. Today, the uniform of the guard is based on the garment of the personal guard of the Great Khan. Throughout the years, the unit uniform has been changed 3 times: in 1970, 2006, and 2011.

Gallery

See also 
 Mongol military tactics and organization
 Military Band of the General Staff of the Armed Forces of Mongolia
 Aibyn Presidential Regiment
 Volgograd Honour Guard

References

External links 
 Photos of the unit.

Military units and formations of Mongolia
Guards of honour
1955 establishments in Mongolia
Military units and formations established in 1955